St. John's Vestry Anglo-Indian Higher Secondary School is a school located in Tiruchirappalli (also known as Trichy), Tamil Nadu, India.  It is missioned by the Church of South India.

It is one of the oldest school in Tamil Nadu and was established by the British around 1763.  It first served as an orphanage for children of British soldiers, but later established itself as a school and moved to its current location. It has a long history and one of the oldest schools in Tamil Nadu & rich in Anglo-Indian tradition dating back to three centuries.

This school was started on 1763 by the British, it was first held inside the vestry room of St. John's church. (A vestry room is the room where a priest changes his clothes to ceremonial robes.) Hence it acquired its name of St. John's vestry school. St.John's church is located near the central bus station.

When the school started it covered only a small area of land at the current location, but expanded so that the campus now has separate buildings within the campus for year 1 to year 8 (Junior and Sub Junior block) and year 9 to year 12 (Senior and Super Senior block). The school has montessori facilities in a separate building.

St. Johns Vestry Anglo Higher Secondary School also has boarding facilities for students from distant places.

References 

Church of South India schools
Christian schools in Tamil Nadu
Boarding schools in Tamil Nadu
Primary schools in Tamil Nadu
High schools and secondary schools in Tamil Nadu
Schools in Tiruchirappalli
Educational institutions established in 1763
1763 establishments in India